= Tokyolite =

- Origin: Bogor, Indonesia
- Genres: R&B; funk; disco
- Years active: 2009 – present
- Members: Stevan Arianto; Alexander Bramono; Rori Jiwa Putra; Ben Maspanger; Bintang Aditya Putra

Tokyolite is an Indonesian band formed in 2009. The band consists Alexander Bramono, Stevan Arianto, Rori Jiwa Putra, Ben Maspanger, and Bintang Aditya Putra. Throughout their career, they have released two albums: one mini-album and two studio album.

== Career ==
Tokyolite began their career by releasing a mini-album titled Hello, which was released on 15 February 2013. The band released their first full album, titled Avenue, on February 14, 2015. Tokyolite released a non-album single titled Cycle on 25 June 2018. A year later, the band released a second non-album single titled Hantu on 2 August 2019. The band released their second studio album, Modern Pastiche, on 14 February 2025.

== Discography ==
=== Mini album ===
- Hello (2013)

=== Studio album ===
- Avenue (2015)
- Modern Pastiche (2025)
